Ur-Lumma was a ruler of the Sumerian city-state of Umma, circa 2400 BCE. His father was King Enakalle, who had been vanquished by Eannatum of Lagash. Ur-Lumma claimed the title of "King" (Lugal). His reign lasted at least 12 years. 

Ur-Lumma again entered in a territorial conflict with Lagash, for the fertile plain of Gu-Edin. Ur-Lumma, attacked Lagash and its king Enannatum, successor of Eannatum, managing to "destroy with fire the stele of Eannatum and the shrines of the gods set up beside it". Ur-Lumma vanquished Enannatum and occupied Lagash, but he was eventually repelled by Entemena, the son of Enannatum. 

Ur-Lumma was replaced by his nephew Illi, a priest-king, who also attacked Lagash, but was again defeated by Entemena.

References

Kings of Umma
24th-century BC Sumerian kings